"Slither" is a song by American hard rock band Velvet Revolver, featured on their 2004 debut album Contraband. When it was released as the second single from the album in 2004, "Slither" topped both the American Billboard Mainstream Rock and Modern Rock charts, as well as reaching number 56 on the main Billboard Hot 100 chart and number 35 on the UK Singles Chart.  The song won the 2005 Grammy for Best Hard Rock Performance.

Composition

Scott Weiland said, "The lyrics are about a relationship. 'When you look you see right through me, cut the rope, fell to my knees, born and broken every single time.' It's just feeling not right in a situation."

Music video
The video, directed by Kevin Kerslake, was filmed in Prague, Czech Republic and Los Angeles. It starts with the band members playing their instruments inside a tunnel while a woman is driving a car seeking for the way to get to that tunnel. As the song continues, people become much more aggressive and the underground concert reaches a peak as band members play hard. Often in the video, Scott Weiland is seen standing before a wall made of human skulls.

Success and awards
It was awarded a Grammy in 2005 for Best Hard Rock Performance, an award Weiland had won with his previous band, Stone Temple Pilots, for the song "Plush" in 1994. In 2009, the song was named the 85th best hard rock song of all time by VH1.

Track listings

Personnel
Scott Weiland – lead vocals 
Slash – lead guitar 
Duff McKagan – bass, backing vocals 
Matt Sorum – drums
Dave Kushner – rhythm guitar

Chart performance
The song reached No. 1 on the Billboard Mainstream Rock Tracks chart, and stayed there for nine weeks. It also became their sole No. 1 hit on the Modern Rock Tracks chart, maintaining the position for four weeks. "Slither" also charted at No. 56 on the Billboard Hot 100, making it Velvet Revolver's highest-charting song and one of the highest-charting songs that Scott Weiland has appeared on.

References

External links

Velvet Revolver songs
2004 singles
Songs written by Scott Weiland
Songs written by Slash (musician)
Songs written by Matt Sorum
Songs written by Duff McKagan
Grammy Award for Best Hard Rock Performance
Songs written by Dave Kushner
2004 songs
RCA Records singles
Song recordings produced by Josh Abraham
Music videos directed by Kevin Kerslake